Florence Barker (November 22, 1891 – February 15, 1913) was an American stage and silent film actress from Los Angeles. 

She began in amateur theatre in her early teens, and her professional debut came in the Ferris Company's production of The Altar of Friendship in Los Angeles in 1907. By age 18, she was playing lead roles at the Grand Theatre in Los Angeles. 

At around this time she started acting in motion pictures and went on to appear in at least 63 films. For several years, Barker was the Biograph Company's leading woman. She also worked in Paris and London as the leading woman with the Pathé Freres film company. By 1912, she was performing for Powers Picture Plays.

Barker died of pneumonia in Los Angeles at the age of 21.

Selected filmography

References

External links

1891 births
1913 deaths
Deaths from pneumonia in California
American film actresses
American silent film actresses
Actresses from Los Angeles
20th-century American actresses